Women inventors have been historically rare in some geographic regions. For example, in the UK, only 33 of 4090 patents (less than 1%) issued between 1617 and 1816 named a female inventor. In the US, in 1954, only 1.5% of patents named a woman, compared with 10.9% in 2002. Women's inventions have historically been concentrated in some areas, such as chemistry and education, and rare in others, such as physics, and electrical and mechanical engineering. Some names such as Marie Curie and Ada Lovelace are widely known, many other women have been active inventors and innovators in a wide range of interests and applications, contributing important developments to the world in which we live.

The following is a list of notable women innovators and inventors displayed by country.

Australia
Rose Cumming (1884–1968), innovative interior decoration
Sally Dominguez (born 1969), modular rainwater tank
Myra Juliet Farrell (1878–1957), tailoring devices, fruit picker
Melissa George (born 1976), style snaps
Veena Sahajwalla (fl 2010s), green steel
Alison Todd (fl 1990s), pathogen detection

Austria

Slawa Duldig (1901–1975), folding umbrella
Ingeborg Hochmair (born 1953), medical devices, cochlear implants
Lise Meitner (1878–1968), radioactivity, nuclear physics
Margarete Schütte-Lihotzky (1897-2000), Frankfurt kitchen
Helene Winterstein-Kambersky (1900-1966), waterproof mascara

Belgium
Guilly d'Herbemont (1888–1980), white cane for blind people
Princess Stéphanie of Belgium (1864–1945), chafing dish
Christine Van Broeckhoven (1953), treatments for neurodegenerative diseases
Maria Clementine Martin (1775–1843), alcoholic herb extract

Brazil
Chu Ming Silveira (1941–1997), public telephone

Canada

Suhayya Abu-Hakima (fl 1982), artificial intelligence
Margaret Atwood (born 1939), robotic writing with the LongPen
Yvonne Brill (1924–2013), propulsion technologies
Maya Burhanpurkar (born 1999), Alzheimer's drugs
Martha Matilda Harper (1857–1950), hair tonic
Catherine McCammon (fl 2000s), spectroscopy-based examination of earth materials
Rachel Zimmerman (born 1972), Blissymbol printer

China
Joyce Chen (1917–1994), woks
Lanying Lin (1918–2003), material engineering
Rosalyn Sussman Yalow (born 1965), brain-science-based learning tools
Dan D. Yang (born 1965), learning systems

Denmark

Dorthe Dahl-Jensen (born 1958), ice cores
Hanne Nielsen (1829–1903), Havarti cheese
Ida Tin (born 1979), menstruation app

Egypt
Hypatia (c.350–415 BC), mathematics, astronomy

France

Danièle Aron-Rosa (born 1935), laser-based eye surgery
Martine Bertereau (born c.1600), mineralogy
Marie Boivin (1773–1841), pelvimeter, vaginal speculum
Herminie Cadolle (1845–1926), brassiere
Madame Clicquot Ponsardin (1777–1866), Champagne riddling
Marie Harel (1761–1844), Camembert cheese
Martine Kempf (born 1951), voice activation system
Géraldine Le Meur (born 1972), digital innovation
Marie Marvingt (1875–1963), metal plane skis
Marguerite Perey (1909–1975), francium
Joanna Truffaut (fl from 2000), urban Wi-Fi networks
Jeanne Villepreux-Power (1794–1871), aquaria

Germany

Melitta Bentz (1873–1950), coffee filter
Bertha Benz (1849–1944), brake linings
Caroline Eichler (1808/9–1843), leg prosthesis, hand prosthesis
Judith Esser-Mittag (born 1921), applicator-free tampon
Marga Faulstich (1915–1998), optical glass
Amelia Freund (1824–1887), cooking stove
Caroline Herschel (1750-1848), astronomer
Sonja de Lennart (born 1920), Capri pants
Maria Goeppert Mayer (1906-1972), nuclear physics
Ida Noddack (1896–1978), nuclear fission
Emmy Noether (1882–1935), algebra, physics
Christiane Nüsslein-Volhard (born 1942), biochemist
Katharina Paulus (1868-1935), collapsible parachute
Agnes Pockels (1862-1935), surface science
Margarete Steiff (1847–1909), stuffed animals
Brigitte Voit (born 1963), polymers

Greece
Spéranza Calo-Séailles (1885–1949), "Lap" decorative concrete

Hungary

Mária Telkes (1900–1995), solar energy

India
Pratibha Gai (fl from 1974), electron microscopy
Munia Ganguli (fl 2010s), drug delivery systems
Sylvia Ratnasamy (born 1976), distributed hash table
Sheila Sri Prakash (born 1955), prefabricated rotationally moulded inspection chamber

Ireland
Jane Ní Dhulchaointigh (fl 2010s), silicone glue

Israel
Ruth Arnon (born 1933), multiple sclerosis drug

Italy

Maria Abbracchio (born 1956), pharmacology
Catia Bastioli (born 1957), biodegradable plastics
Patrizia A. Caraveo (born 1954), particle physics
Maria Cristina Facchini (fl from 1980s), aerosols
Elena of Montenegro (1873–1952), signed photographs
Maria Montessori (1870–1952), physician and educator

Japan
Teruko Mizushima (1920–1996), time-based currency
Katsuko Saruhashi (1920–2007), measurement of carbon-dioxide concentrations in seawater

Latvia
Marija Šimanska (1922–1995), heterocyclic compounds
Lina Stern (1878–1968), blood–brain barrier

Netherlands

Katja Loos (born 1971), enzymatic polymerization
Laura J. van 't Veer (born 1957), cancer risk screening
Saskia Wieringa (born 1950), gender relations

New Zealand
Elizabeth Ann Louisa Mackay (1843–1908), cooking utensils

Nigeria
Omowunmi Sadik (born 1964), microelectrode sensing, environmental applications

Poland
Marie Curie (1867–1934), radioactivity

Portugal
Antonia Ferreira (1811–1896), winemaking

Romania
Ana Aslan (1897–1988), ageing treatment

Russia

Anna Pavlova (1881–1931), pointe shoes for ballet
Irina Beletskaya (born 1933), organometallic chemistry

Singapore
Lin Hsin Hsin (fl 1990s), various IT inventions

Spain
Concepción Aleixandre (1862–1952), gynecology
Ángela Ruiz Robles (1895–1975), electronic book reader
Margarita Salas (1938–2019), DNA amplication

Sweden
Maria Christina Bruhn (1732–1808), gunpowder packaging
Eva Ekeblad (1724–1786), agronomy
Amalia Eriksson (1824–1923), candy stick
Simone Giertz (born 1990), robotic devices
Iréne Grahn (1945–2013), patented finger joint support for patients with rheumatoid arthritis
Hanna Hammarström (1829–1909), telephone wires
Ninni Kronberg (1874–1946), powdered milk
Laila Ohlgren (1937–2014), mobile telephony

Switzerland
Ursula Keller (born 1959), laser technology

United Arab Emirates
Reem Al Marzouqi (fl 2000s), car driven without hands

United Kingdom

Princess Anne of Löwenstein-Wertheim-Freudenberg (1864–1927), automatic balancing bed
Anna Atkins (1799–1871), photography
Hertha Ayrton (1854–1923), electric arc lighting
Melitta Bentz (died 1836), Berkley Horse
Lauren Bowker (born 1985), colour-change inks
Roxey Ann Caplin (1793–1888), corsetry
Adelaide Claxton (fl 1860s–1890s), ear caps
Eleanor Coade (1733–1821), artificial stoneware
Emily Cummins (born 1987), evaporative refrigeration
Fiona Fairhurst (fl 2009), swimsuits
Christine Foyer (born 1952), plant science
Rosalind Franklin (1920-1958), chemist
Ida Freund (1863–1914), gas measurement
Barbara Gilmour (died 1732), cheese making 
Sarah Guppy (1770–1852), bridge construction, domestic devices
Mandy Haberman (born 1956), baby bottles
Diane Hart (1926–2002), corsetry
Valerie Hunter Gordon (1921–2016), disposable diapers, sanitary towels
Phyllis Margaret Tookey Kerridge (1901–1940), glass electrodes
Marie Killick (1914–1964), sapphire stylus
Helen Lee (researcher) (fl from 1990s), diagnostic kits for infectious disease
Ada Lovelace (1815-1852), mathematician 
Heather Martin (designer) (fl from 2000), interaction design
Jane A. McKeating (fl from 1990s), molecular biology
Emma Parmee (fl from 1990s), antidiabetic drugs
Lucy Rogers (fl from 1990s), animatronic controllers
Leslie Scott (born 1955), board games
Beatrice Shilling (1909–1990), device for aircraft engines
Bridget Elizabeth Talbot (1885–1971), watertight electric torch
Asha Peta Thompson (fl 2000s), wearable technology

United States
A
Berenice Abbott (1898–1991), photography
Alice Alldredge (born 1949), marine biology
Frances Allen (1932–2020), computer scientist
Randi Altschul (born 1960), cellphones, games and toys
Susan Amara (fl from 2000), drug discovery
Anne Anastasi (1908–2001), psychometrics
Betsy Ancker-Johnson (born 1927), plasma physics
Beth Anderson (born 1950), music composition
Laurie Anderson (born 1947), electronic music
Mary Anderson, windscreen wipers
Virginia Apgar (1909–1974), health of newborns
Frances Arnold (born 1956), enzyme engineering
Barbara Askins (born 1939), photographic negative enhancement

B

Tabitha Babbitt (1779–c. 1853), tool making
Betty Lou Bailey (1929–2007), exhaust nozzle
Ellene Alice Bailey (1853–1897), clothing, household goods
Betsey Metcalf Baker (1786–1867), straw bonnets
Anna Baldwin (fl 1860s), milk production
Alice Pike Barney (1857–1931), mechanical devices
Janet Emerson Bashen (born 1957), software
Patricia Bath (born 1942), medical devices
Maria Beasley (fl 1870s–1890s), barrel hooper, life rafts
Ruth Benedict (1887–1948), anthropology
Ruth R. Benerito (1916–2013), cotton fabrics
Miriam Benjamin (1861–1947), hotel chairs
Evelyn Berezin (1925–2018), computerized typewriter
Margaret Olofsson Bergman (1872–1948), looms
Barbara Beskind (fl 1945–1956), therapeutic devices
Patricia Billings (born 1926), Geobond building material
Hazel Bishop (1906–1998), lipstick
Sara Blakely (born 1971), hosiery
Helen Blanchard (1840–1922), sewing machines
Joani Blank (1937–2016), vibrators
Katharine Burr Blodgett (1898–1979), low-reflectance glass
Bessie Blount Griffin (1914–2009), feeding devices, disposable basins 
Vanna Bonta (1958–2014), flight suit for weightless environments
Sarah Boone (1832–1904), ironing boards
Shree Bose (born 1994), drugs for treating cancer
Charlotte Bridgwood (1861–1929), windshield wipers
Louise Brigham (1875–1956), modular furniture design
Marie Van Brittan Brown (1922–1999), home security systems
Deborah Washington Brown (1952–2020), speech recognition
Rachel Fuller Brown (1898–1980), antibiotics
Mary Brush (fl 1815), corsets

C
Ve Elizabeth Cadie, (20th century), heat insulating handle for small home appliances, coffee pot
Mary P. Carpenter (1840–1900), sewing machines, mosquito nets
Keiana Cavé (born 1998), oil spill disperants
Leona Chalmers (fl 1937), menstrual cup
Melanie Chartoff (born 1950), water recycling
Deanna M. Church (fl from 1990s), human genome
Inga Stephens Pratt Clark (1906–1970), scarf
Edith Clarke (1883–1959), electrical engineering
Josephine Cochrane (1839–1913), dishwasher
Lynn Conway (born 1938), computer science
Martha Coston (1826–1904), marine signalling
Cathy A. Cowan (fl from 1990s), health care cost trends
Margaret Crane (fl 1967), home pregnancy test
Caresse Crosby (1891–1970), modern bra
Rose Cumming (1887–1968), wallpapers
Jamie Lee Curtis (born 1958), diapers

D
Emily Davenport (1810–1862), electric motor
Constance Demby (1939–2021), electronic musical instruments
Olive Dennis (1885–1957), passenger train equipment
Maude Dickinson (c.1866–1933), hygiene products
Marion Donovan (1917–1998), disposable diapers
Anna Dormitzer (1830–1903), window-cleaning equipment
Emily C. Duncan (born 1849), banking calculators

E
Tomima Edmark (born 1957), garments designed for online sales
Ellen Eglin (born 1849), clothes wringer
Gertrude B. Elion (1918–1999), medical research, drugs
Jeri Ellsworth (born 1974), computer design

F
Ethel Finck (1932–2003), cardiac catheter
Edith M. Flanigen (born 1929), molecular sieves
Irmgard Flügge-Lotz (1903–1974), aircraft guidance systems
Eunice Newton Foote (1819–1888), greenhouse effect, boot soles
Josephine G. Fountain (fl 1960), direct suction tracheotomy tube
Helen Murray Free (1923–2021), diabetes tests

G

Frances Gabe (1015–2016), self-cleaning house
Ruth Graves Wakefield (1903–1977), chocolate chip cookies
Sarah E. Goode (1855–1905), folding cabinet bed
Linda Gottfredson (born 1947), educational psychology
Olga D. González-Sanabria (fl from 1979), battery technology, systems management
Bette Nesmith Graham (1924–1980), liquid paper
Temple Grandin (born 1947), hug machine
Elizabeth Riddle Graves (1916–1972), Manhattan Project
Lori Greiner (born 1969), household sponge, toilet accessories

H
Mary Hallock-Greenewalt (1871–1950), visual music
Ruth Handler (1916–2002), Barbie doll
Elise Harmon (1909–1985), computer miniaturization
Martha Matilda Harper (1857–1950), retail franchising
Arlene Harris (born 1948), mobile and wireless technologies
Ami Harten (1946–1994), applied mathematics
Elizabeth Lee Hazen (1885–1975), antifungal medication
Marti Hearst (fl from 1990s), text mining
Ada Henry Van Pelt (1838–1923), water purification
Beulah Louise Henry (1887–1973), sewing machines, freezers, typewriters
Isabella Coler Herb (c.1863–1943), ether administration to patients
Leta Stetter Hollingworth (1886–1939), educational psychology
Mabel White Holmes (1890–1977), baking mixes
Erna Schneider Hoover (born 1926), computerized telephone switching
Grace Hopper (1906–1992), computer programming language compiler
Frances Hugle (1927–1968), semiconductors 
Simona Hunyadi Murph (fl 2010s), nano technologies
Ida Henrietta Hyde (1857–1945), intracellular micropipette electrode

J
Mary Lou Jepsen (born 1965), computer applications, sunlight-readable display, laptop development
Karen C. Johnson (born 1955), preventative health
Kristina M. Johnson (born 1957), optoelectronic processing, 3-D imaging
Nancy Maria Donaldson Johnson (1794–1890), hand-operated ice cream freezer
Amanda Jones (1935–1914), vacuum canning
Eldorado Jones (1860–1932), aeronautical mufflers, electric iron developments
Marjorie Joyner (1896–1994), cosmetics, permanent waving

K

Anna Keichline (1899–1943), interior design, kitchen features, construction bricks
Mary Kenner (1912–2006), sanitary belt
Mary Dixon Kies (1752–1837), hat manufacture
Elizabeth Kingsley (1871–1957), crossword puzzles
Edith Klemperer (1898–1987), neurology and psychiatry 
Margaret E. Knight (1838–1914), flat-bottomed paper bag
June Kroenke (fl 1960s–1990s), sewing tools
Deepika Kurup (born 1998), solar-powered water purification
Stephanie Kwolek (1923–2014), synthetic fibres 
Angela Kornas (born 1977), bra inserts

L
Hedy Lamarr (1914–2000), radio guidance systems
Esther Lederberg (1922–2006), microbial genetics
Cricket Lee (born 1953), clothing fitting
Tara Lemmey (fl 2010s), information technology
Jennifer A. Lewis (born 1964), 3D printing
Lisa Lindahl (born 1948), exercise bra
Barbara Liskov (born 1939), computer programming 

M
Elizabeth Magie (1866–1948), game of Monopoly
Misha Mahowald (1963–1996), computational systems
Annie Malone (1869–1957), cosmetics
Helen Herrick Malsed (1910–1998), toys
Joy Mangano (born 1956), self-wringing mop, luggage systems
Elizabeth Holloway Marston (1893–1993), systolic blood-pressure test
Sybilla Righton Masters (1676–1720), corn milling, hat making
Jessica O. Matthews (fl from 2008), energy-storing devices
Melanie Mayron (born 1952), skin care products
Frances McConnell-Mills (1900–1975), hair rinse
Florence Melton (1911–2007), foam-soled slippers
Barbara Haviland Minor (fl from 1980s), refrigerants
Heidi Messer (born 1969), online marketing
Ynes Mexia (1870–1938), botany
Catharine Cox Miles (1890–1984), human intelligence
Joan L. Mitchell (1947–2015), JPEG image format
Sumita Mitra (born 1949), dental filler based on nanoparticles
Karen Mohlke (fl from 1990s), human genetics
Mary Sherman Morgan (1921–2004), hydyne rocket fuel
Virginia A. Myers (1927–2015), printing press developments

N
Klára Dán von Neumann (1911–1963), early computer applications, including meteorology
Lyda D. Newman (fl 1890s), hairbrush

P
Karen Panetta (fl 1990s), medical diagnostics software
Alice H. Parker (1885–1920), gas-powered central-heating furnace
Bonnie Pemberton (fl from 1990s), cat anti-scratch deterrent
Radia Perlman (born 1951), spanning-tree networking protocol
Lindsay Phillips (born 1984), flip-flop design
Mary Florence Potts (1850–1922), clothes irons

Q
Agnes J. Quirk (1884–1974), penicillin producation

R

Gitanjali Rao (born 2005), measurement of lead content in water
Sibyl M. Rock (1909–1981), mass spectrometry
Ernestine Rose (1810–1892), deodorizer
Lorraine Rothman (1932–2007), menstrual extraction kit 

S
Leona D. Samson (born 1952), DNA repair
Ginny Scales-Medeiros (fl 1970s), tanning system
Sandra Scarr (born 1936), developmental psychology
Becky Schroeder (born 1962), Glow Sheet for writing in the dark
Patsy O'Connell Sherman (1930–2008), Scotchgard, repellents
Altina Schinasi (1907–1999), Harlequin eyeglass frame
Amy B. Smith (born 1962), screenless hammer mill, phase-change incubator
Pamela S. Soltis (born 1957), botany, polyploidy
Fannie S. Spitz (1873–1943), nut-shelling equipment
Vesta Stoudt (1891–1966), duct tape
Edith Stern (born 1952), holds over 100 patents in various computerized applications
Harriet Williams Russell Strong (1844–1926), water storage
Janese Swanson (born 1958), educational games

T
Esther Takeuchi (born 1953), energy storage
Emily E. Tassey (1823–1899), marine technology
Emily E. Tassey (fl 1980s), women's bicycles
Valerie Thomas (born 1943), illusion transmitter
Elizabeth Sthreshley Townsend (died 1919), braille typewriter
Harriet Tracy (1834–1918), elevators and sewing machines
Ann Tsukamoto (born 1952), stem cell research
Madeline Turner (fl 1916), fruit press
Anne Tyng (1920–2011), children's construction set

V
Gordana Vunjak-Novakovic (fl 1990s), tissue grafts

W
Grace Wahba (born 1934), statistics
Mary Walton (fl 1879), reduced hazards of smoke emissions
Josephine Webb (born 1918), switchgear
Sandra Welner (1858–2001), patient examination table
Eliza Wilbur (1851–1930), telescopes
Margaret A. Wilcox (born 1838), car heater design
Nancy Farley Wood (1903–2003), ionizing radiation detectors

Y
Rosalyn Sussman Yalow (1921–2011), radioimmunoassay technique

See also
List of inventions and discoveries by women

References

Innovators

Inventors